Dol-gau (or Dôl-gau) is a small village in the  community of Tirymynach, Ceredigion, Wales, which is 76.4 miles (123 km) from Cardiff and 177.5 miles (285.7 km) from London. Dôl-gau is represented in the Senedd by Elin Jones (Plaid Cymru) and is part of the Ceredigion constituency in the House of Commons.

Etymology
This name derives from the Welsh and means "an enclosed meadow".

References

See also
List of localities in Wales by population

Villages in Ceredigion